Aleksei Fedoseyevich Zasukhin (18 March 1937 – 27 May 1996) was a Soviet boxer who won a national title and a European silver medal in 1961. He retired in 1962 after finishing second in the Soviet championships. During his career Zasukhin won 150 bouts out of 170. He graduated from the Belarusian State University of Physical Training, and later worked as a boxing coach in Yekaterinburg and in Saint Petersburg. His elder brother Aleksandr was an Olympic boxer and an inspiration for Aleksei.

References

1937 births
1996 deaths
Soviet male boxers
Russian male boxers
Featherweight boxers